Aufhausen (bei Erding) station is a railway station in the Aufhausen district of the municipality of Erding, located in the Erding district in Upper Bavaria, Germany.

References

External links

Munich S-Bahn stations
Railway stations in Bavaria
Railway stations in Germany opened in 1872
1872 establishments in Bavaria
Buildings and structures in Erding (district)